Pseudopaludicola ternetzi is a species of frog in the family Leptodactylidae. It is endemic to Brazil. Its natural habitats are moist savanna, subtropical or tropical moist shrubland, subtropical or tropical seasonally wet or flooded lowland grassland, swamps, moist montane forests, intermittent freshwater marshes, pastureland, ponds, and seasonally flooded agricultural land. It is threatened by habitat loss.

References

Pseudopaludicola
Endemic fauna of Brazil
Taxonomy articles created by Polbot
Amphibians described in 1937